Laura Solórzano (born 1961 Guadalajara) is a Mexican poet.

Life 
She studied Psychology at the University of Guadalajara, and Visual Arts at the National Autonomous University of Mexico. She teaches at the Centro de Arte Audiovisual, Guadalajara.

Works

Poetry 
 Evolución (University of Guadalajara, 1976), 
 Ficus Seed (Ediciones Rimbaud, Tlaxcala, 1999), 
 Lobo de labio (El Cálamo, Guadalajara, Jalisco, 2003),  
 Lip Wolf, Jen Hofer translation (Action Books, Notre Dame, 2007),  
 Boca perdida (Editorial bonobos, Toluca, 2005 ), 
 A rose bush for Mr. K (University of Guanajuato, 2006),

Collections 
 The mirror in the cage (Secretariat of Culture, Guadalajara, Jalisco, 2006), 
 Nervio Náufrago (La Zonámbula, 2011), 
 Excursion to the powder forest (Ruido Blanco, Ecuador, 2013) and Vegetal Prayer (Mano Santa, 2015).

Anthologies 
 Without visible doors (editions without name, and University of Pittsburgh, 2003),
 Echo of voices (Arlequín, FONCA / SIGMA, 2004),
 Poesía viva de Jalisco (editorial CONACULTA / University of Guadalajara, 2004 ) 
 Pulir huesos (Editorial Galaxia de Gutemberg, Barcelona, 2008).

References

External links 
 

1961 births
Living people
Mexican poets
People from Guadalajara, Jalisco